Mac Para Technology s.r.o. is a Czech aircraft manufacturer based in Rožnov pod Radhoštěm and founded by Peter Recek. The company specializes in the design and manufacture of paragliders and paramotor wings, in the form of ready-to-fly aircraft, as well as paragliding harnesses, rescue parachutes and glider bags.

The company is a společnost s ručením omezeným, a Czech private limited company.

By the mid-2000s the company offered a full range of paragliders, including the  intermediate Eden, Intox and Muse, the competition Magus and the two-pace tandem Pasha paragliders.

Aircraft 

Summary of aircraft built by Mac Para Technology:
Mac Bitch
Mac Blaze
Mac Charger
Mac Eden
Mac Elan
Mac Icon
Mac Intox
Mac Magus
Mac Muse
Mac Paradox
Mac Pasha
Mac Progress
Mac T-Ride
Mac Whistler
Mac Yukon

References

External links

Aircraft manufacturers of the Czech Republic and Czechoslovakia
Ultralight aircraft
Paramotors
Paragliders